Canarium littorale is a tree found in tropical Asia and is a member of the incense tree family Burseraceae. The specific epithet  is from the Latin meaning "of the seashore", referring to its habitat.

Description
Its grey bark is smooth to scaly.

Distribution and habitat
Canarium littorale grows naturally in Indo-China, Sumatra, Peninsular Malaysia, Java and Borneo. Its habitat is forests from sea-level to  altitude.

References

littorale
Trees of Indo-China
Trees of Malesia
Taxonomy articles created by Polbot